Coşkun Birdal (born 12 December 1973) is a retired Turkish footballer. He last played as a forward for Pendikspor in 2011.

Career
Coşkun began his career at Kartalspor in his teenage years. He became professional at Bayburtspor in 1996. He has played for Bayburtspor (1994–1997), Erzurumspor (1997–2000), Konyaspor (2000), Denizlispor (2000–2002 and 2003–2004), Samsunspor (2002–2003), Vestel Manisaspor (2004–2005) and Antalyaspor during his career. He played for Antalyaspor and he has come into attention after he scored a hat-trick against Beşiktaş J.K. and Kayserispor in 2006-2007 season. He played for Eskişehirspor in 2007-2008 season and moved to Kayseri Erciyesspor in 2010.

References

1973 births
People from Bayburt
Living people
Turkish footballers
Fenerbahçe S.K. footballers
Kartalspor footballers
Konyaspor footballers
Denizlispor footballers
Samsunspor footballers
Manisaspor footballers
Antalyaspor footballers
Eskişehirspor footballers
Erzurumspor footballers
Pendikspor footballers
Süper Lig players

Association football forwards